Pseudophoxinus atropatenus, also known as the Azerbaijani spring roach or Shirvan roachling,  is a species of freshwater fish in the family Cyprinidae. 

It is only found in the Kura River drainage in Azerbaijan, inhabiting small spring lakes in an area of max. 44 km diameter.

In the Mediterranean clade of Pseudophoxinus, the Azerbaijani spring roach is the only  species that inhabits Transcaucasus. Biogeographically it appears to be a Miocene-Pliocene relict in this region.

References

Pseudophoxinus
Fish described in 1937